Dweller may refer to:

 Dweller (film), a 2000 film by independent film icons the Polonia brothers
 Dwellers (film), a 2021 film directed by Drew Fortier
 Dweller (novel), a 2010 horror novel by Jeff Strand
 Dweller (Banks), a fictional species featured in Iain M. Banks' novel The Algebraist
 "Dweller", a song by Priestess from certain editions of the album Prior to the Fire

See also
 Dwell (disambiguation)